Armin Hadipour Seighalani (born August 12, 1994) is an Iranian Taekwondo athlete who won a silver medal at the 2017 World Taekwondo Championships. He has qualified to represent Iran at the 2020 Summer Olympics in the Men's 58 kg category.

Hadipour becomes tops off Student Athletes of the 2010s list of FISU for winning 3 consecutive Gold Medals at 2015, 2017 and 2019 Universiade.

References 

Living people
1994 births
Iranian male taekwondo practitioners
Universiade medalists in taekwondo
Universiade gold medalists for Iran
Medalists at the 2015 Summer Universiade
Medalists at the 2017 Summer Universiade
Medalists at the 2019 Summer Universiade
World Taekwondo Championships medalists
Asian Taekwondo Championships medalists
Taekwondo practitioners at the 2020 Summer Olympics
Olympic taekwondo practitioners of Iran
21st-century Iranian people